Franciscus Lé Livec de Trésurin (1726–1792) was a French Jesuit who was one of the victims of the September Massacres. He was beatified by Pope Pius XI on 17 October 1926.

1726 births
1792 deaths
French beatified people
18th-century French Jesuits
French clergy killed in the French Revolution